Government Medical College also Nizamabad Medical College is a medical college located in Nizamabad, Telangana, India. It began its academic year from 2013-14. It is affiliated to Kaloji Narayana Rao University of Health Sciences.

History
It received clearance from Medical Council of India to start its academic year from year 2013-14 with 100 seats for MBBS.

The college also has DNB Seats in various Broad speciality courses like General Medicine, General Surgery, Obstetrics & Gynaecology, Anesthesia and Paediatrics (updated as per July-17 session).

See also
Government General Hospital, Nizamabad
Education in India
Literacy in India
List of institutions of higher education in Telangana
Medical Council of India

References

External links 
 

Medical colleges in Telangana
Nizamabad, Telangana
2013 establishments in Andhra Pradesh
Educational institutions established in 2013